A double referendum was held in Egypt on 19 April 1979. The two subjects were the Egypt–Israel peace treaty and changes to the country's political system, including the reintroduction of multi-party politics and the change to a bicameral Parliament through the creation of the Shura Council. The Peace Treaty was approved by 99.9% of voters, whilst the political reforms were approved by 99.7%. Voter turnout was 90.2%.

Results

Egypt–Israel Peace Treaty

Political reforms

References

Egypt
1979 in Egypt
Referendums in Egypt
Constitutional referendums in Egypt
April 1979 events in Africa